Veljko Kovačević (19 December 1912 – 24 May 1994) was a Montenegrin general and writer.

Biography
He was born in Grahovo (part of Nikšić) in the Kingdom of Montenegro. After abandoning the studies at the Faculty of Philosophy in Zagreb in 1937 he volunteered in the Spanish Civil War. After internment in France (1939–1941) as requested by the leadership of the Communist Party, he organized partisan units in Gorski Kotar and along the Croatian littoral. After the end of World War II he held several senior military and government posts. In 1952 he finished the Higher Military Academy in Belgrade. He studied military history, and war topics were a recurrent theme in his stories and novels.

He died in Belgrade.

Works
 U rovovima Španije (1958)
 Kapelski kresovi (1961)
 Mlada šuma (1966)
 Gavrijada (1971)
 Dani koji ne odlaze (I–II, 1985)

Notes

1912 births
1994 deaths
Military personnel from Nikšić
Writers from Nikšić
Yugoslav people of the Spanish Civil War
Foreign volunteers in the Spanish Civil War
Montenegrin communists
Recipients of the Order of the People's Hero